The International Harvester Company (often abbreviated by IHC, IH, or simply International was an American manufacturer of agricultural and construction equipment, automobiles, commercial trucks, lawn and garden products, household equipment, and more. It was formed from the 1902 merger of McCormick Harvesting Machine Company and Deering Harvester Company and three smaller manufactures: Milwaukee; Plano; and Warder, Bushnell, and Glessner (manufacturers of Champion brand). Its brands included McCormick, Deering, and later McCormick-Deering, as well as International. Along with the Farmall and Cub Cadet tractors, International was also known for the Scout and Travelall vehicle nameplates. In the 1980s all divisions were sold off except for International Trucks, which changed its parent company name to Navistar International (NYSE: NAV).
Given its monumental importance to the building of rural communities the brand continues to have a massive cult following. The International Harvester legacy non-profits host some of the largest agriculture related events in the United States.

Following years of financial and economic decline, International began selling its separate equipment divisions, starting with the sale of the construction division to Dresser Industries in 1982. In November 1984 IH finalized a deal with Tenneco to sell the farm equipment division to Tenneco's subsidiary Case Corporation, and the brand continues as Case IH which is owned by CNH. The European division exists today as McCormick Tractors and is owned by ARGO SpA of Italy. International became solely a truck and engine manufacturer and reorganized as Navistar International in 1986.  Throughout its existence International Harvester was headquartered in Chicago, Illinois. In 2020 Volkswagen agreed to fully purchase the remaining shares of Navistar.

History

Founding 
The roots of International Harvester run to the 1830s, when Virginia inventor Cyrus Hall McCormick perfected his version of a horse-drawn reaper, which he field-demonstrated in 1831 and for which he received a patent in 1834. Together with his brother Leander J. McCormick, he moved to Chicago in 1847 to be closer to the Midwestern grain fields and founded the McCormick Harvesting Machine Company. The reaper sold well, partially as a result of savvy and innovative business practices. Their products came onto the market just as the development of railroads offered wide distribution to distant territories. He developed a vast support network to demonstrate field operations. McCormick died in 1884 and his company passed to his son, Cyrus McCormick, Jr., whose antipathy and incompetence toward organized labor sparked the Haymarket affair, the origin of May Day as a labor holiday.

In 1902, the McCormick Harvesting Machine Company and Deering Harvester Company, along with three smaller agricultural equipment firms (Milwaukee Harvesting Machine Co., Plano Manufacturing Co., and Warder, Bushnell, and Glessner—manufacturers of Champion brand) merged to create the International Harvester Company. Banker J.P. Morgan provided the financing. The architect of the merger was George W. Perkins, one of the Morgan executives about whom Cyrus McCormick described as the "most brilliant negotiator he had ever known."  The new company was valued at $150 million. In 1919, IH bought the Parlin and Orendorff factory in Canton, Illinois, a leader in plow manufacturing, renaming it Canton Works.  International Harvester was one of the main clients of Product Miniature Company.

Sustained success
In 1926, IH's Farmall Works built a new plant in Rock Island, Illinois. By 1930, the 100,000th Farmall was produced. IH next set their sights on introducing a true 'general-purpose' tractor to satisfy the needs of the average American family farmer. The resulting 'letter' series of Raymond Loewy-designed Farmall tractors in 1939 proved a huge success. IH dominated the market through the 1950s despite stiff competition from Ford, Allis Chalmers, Massey Ferguson and John Deere.

IH ranked 33rd among United States corporations in the value of World War II production contracts. In 1946 IH acquired a defense plant in Louisville, Kentucky, which was adapted for production of the Farmall A, B, and the new 340 tractors. It acquired the Metropolitan Body Company of Bridgeport, Connecticut, in 1948. The commercially successful Metro line of forward control vans and trucks were produced here from 1938 until 1964.

In 1970, Pacific Trucks was purchased. In 1974, the five-millionth IHC tractor was produced at the Rock Island Farmall plant.

Throughout the 1960s and 1970s, despite good sales, IH's profit margins remained slim. The continual addition of unrelated business lines created a somewhat unwieldy corporate organization. Overly conservative management and a rigid policy of in-house promotion tended to stifle new management strategies and technical innovation. IH faced strong competition and increased production costs, primarily due to labor and government-imposed environmental and safety regulations. In 1974 the 5 millionth International Harvester tractor, a 1066, was manufactured.

Downfall
In 1979 IH named a new CEO, Archie McCardell, who was determined to improve profit margins and drastically cut costs. Unprofitable lines were terminated and factory production was curtailed. By the end of the year, profits were at their highest levels in 10 years but cash reserves were still low. Union members became increasingly irate over these measures and in the spring of 1979, IH prepared to face a strike. On November 1, IH announced McCardell had received a $1.8 million bonus. After he pressed for more concessions from the United Auto Workers, a strike was called on November 2, 1979. By the time it ended, the strike had cost the company almost $600 million (over $1 billion today).

By 1981, the company's finances were at their lowest point ever. The company sold its Payline division of construction equipment to Dresser Industries in 1982. Further assets were sold to Tenneco, Inc., in 1984.

Following the merger, tractor production at Farmall Works ceased in 1985. Production of the new Case IH tractors moved to J.I. Case in Racine, Wisconsin. Production of IH Axial-Flow combines continued at the East Moline, Illinois, factory.  The Memphis Works plant was closed. The truck and engine divisions remained and in 1986, Harvester changed the corporate name to Navistar International Corporation, having sold the International Harvester name to Tenneco. Navistar International Corporation continues to manufacture medium- and heavy-duty trucks, school buses, and engines under the International brand name.

Divisions and products

Agriculture Division

The International Harvester Agricultural Division may have been second to the Truck Division but it was the best-known subsidiary. One of its early products was the Traction Truck, a frame manufactured by Morton Traction Truck Company (later bought by IHC) featuring an IHC engine.

From 1902 to the early 1920s, the McCormick and Deering dealerships kept their original branding with Mogul tractors sold by McCormick and Titan tractors at Deering due to the still-present competitiveness of the former rivals.

The early tractors
IH produced a range of large gasoline-powered farm tractors under the Mogul and Titan brands. Sold by McCormick dealers, the Type C Mogul was little more than a stationary engine on a tractor chassis, fitted with friction drive (one speed forward, one reverse).  Between 1911 and 1914, 862 were built. These tractors had varied success but the trend going into the mid-1910s was toward "small" and "cheap".The company's first important tractors were the 10-20 and 15-30 models. Introduced in 1915, they were primarily used as traction engines to pull plows and for belt work on threshing machines. The 10-20 and 15-30 had similar Mogul and Titan versions.

Concurrently, IHC purchased a number of smaller competitors. Parlin & Orendorff (P&O Plow) and Chattanooga Plow were purchased in 1919. Other brand names they incorporated include Keystone, D.M. Osborne, Kemp, Meadows, Sterling, Weber, Plano, and Champion.

In 1924 IH introduced the Farmall, a smaller general-purpose tractor, to fend off competition from Ford Motor Company's Fordson tractors. Farmall was a leader in the emerging row-crop tractor segment.

Following the introduction of Farmall, several similarly styled "F Series" models were introduced while the original design continued to be produced as the "Regular."

In 1932, IH produced their first diesel engine for the McCormick-Deering TD-40 crawler. This engine would start on gasoline and then switch to diesel. Other diesel engines of this era were difficult to start in cold weather and using gasoline allowed the engine to thoroughly warm up first. In 1935, it was used in the WD-40, becoming the first diesel tractor on wheels in North America (the world's first diesel tractor was Germany's Benz-Sendling BS 6 in 1922).

Heavy tractors
The market for industrial tractors grew in the 1930s. The TD-40, the first of IH's heavy-equipment crawlers, was suited for a wide range of environments. As demand for construction equipment grew, so did the competition. The diversification of the agricultural tractor range into genuine construction equipment whetted appetites for further expansion. In 1937 IH engaged designer Raymond Loewy to revamp its product line and logo. In 1938 the first such model was the TD-65 heavy tractor, later renamed the TD-18.

The letter and standard series

For model year 1939, Raymond Loewy created the Farmall "letter series" (A, B, BN, C, H, and M) and the McCormick-Deering "standard series" (W-4, W-6, and W-9). For 1941 the MD model was introduced as the first row crop diesel-powered tractor; over a decade later, IH's largest competitor, John Deere, introduced a diesel option on their row crop models. The letter series tractors were updated to the "super" series in 1953 (with the exception of the A, which had become a "super" in 1947, and the B and BN, which were discontinued in 1948). Many of these tractors (especially the largest, the H, M, and W models) are still in operation on farms today. Especially desirable are the diesel-powered MD, WD-6, and WD-9's. 

The letter and standard series of tractors was produced until 1954 and was a defining product in IH history.

In 1947, the smallest tractor in the Farmall line was introduced, the Cub. With a 60-cu. in., four-cylinder engine and a 69-inch wheelbase, the Cub was aimed at small farms which had previously relied on horse-drawn equipment. Like the various John Deere L/LA/LI models, one of the "mechanization-resistant" markets it hoped to penetrate was the small one-mule family farms of the rural American Deep South, but the Cub also sold to owners of larger farms needing a second tractor. Production of the Cub commenced at the newly acquired and updated Farmall Works-Louisville plant (formerly the wartime Curtiss-Wright Aircraft factory in Louisville, Kentucky). Selling for $545 in 1947, the Cub proved extremely popular and its design continued largely unchanged mechanically until 1979.

For 1955 in IH tractors, the numbered "hundred series" was offered. Although given slightly different styling and few new features, they were still updates to the models introduced in 1939. The only new tractor in the 1955 lineup was the 300 Utility. In 1957 power was increased in some models and the 230 Utility was introduced.

Heavy tractors: the 1950s
IH would sell 38,000 TD-18 series tractors between 1938 and 1958. The TD-18 would be replaced by an upgraded TD-18A in 1949 and 181/182 variants in 1955. In 1958 the TD-20 crawler was introduced.

60 Series recall
In July 1958, IH launched a major campaign to introduce a new line of tractors, the 60 series. At the Hinsdale, Illinois, Testing Farm, IH entertained over 12,000 dealers from over 25 countries. The series included the first-of-its-kind six-cylinder 460 and 560 tractors. Unfortunately just a year later, these models were recalled due to final drive component failures. They had not been updated since 1939 and would fail rapidly under the stress of the more powerful 60-series engines. Some customers lost faith in IH and migrated to John Deere's New Generation of Power tractors introduced in 1960.

1960s

Throughout the 1960s, IH introduced new tractors and new sales techniques. As producing tractors was the lifeblood of the company, IH would have to remain competitive in this field. They both succeeded and failed at this goal but farming was about to change. In 1963, IH introduced the  706 and  806 tractors. Until the 88 series, all numbered seies tractors followed a simple numbering system. The first 2-3 digits was the horsepower rating, and the last number was the number of cylinders, so a 1486 was rated 148 hp and had a 6 cyl. engine, while the 1468 had 146 hp and a v8 engine. In 1964, IH made its four-millionth tractor, an 806. In 1965, IH introduced its first  two-wheel-drive tractor, the 1206. Another option became available in 1965 for the 706, 806, and the new 1206: a factory-installed cab (made by Stopler Allen Co.), often called the "ice cream box" due to its shape. It could be equipped with a fan and heater. By 1967, over 100,000 models 706, 806, and 1206 were built. The 276 was also built at this time, becoming popular for smaller farms with tighter lanes and fields due to its lighter weight.

In 1967 was the introduction of the bigger and more powerful 56 series tractors as replacements for the popular "06" series. These new models included the  656,  756, the  856, and the  1256. The "ice cream box" cab was still an option. Also that year, the  826 was introduced with the option of gearshift or hydrostatic transmissions. The "ice cream box" cab was dropped and replaced with a new "custom" cab made by Exel Industries which could be equipped with factory air-conditioning, heat, and an AM radio.

1970s
In 1971, IH introduced the 66 series line. The new models included the  766, the  966, the  1066 turbo, the  1466 Turbo, and the  1468 V-8. The  4166 4WD was also introduced. The 966 and 1066 were available with Hydro or gearshift transmissions and the choice of two-post roll over protection structures (ROPs) or two different cabs, the "custom" and the "deluxe". Both could be equipped with air conditioning, heat, and AM-FM radios.

In 1972, the 666 replaced the long-running 656, the  1568 V-8 replaced the 1468, and the  1566 and the  4366 4WD were introduced. Also later that year, four-post ROPs replaced two-post; the "custom" cab was dropped and the "deluxe" cab was now painted red instead of white. Due to horsepower confusions, the 966 and 1066 Hydro models were restriped; the Hydro 100 and the 666 Hydro became the Hydro 70. On February 1, 1974, at 9:00 am, the five-millionth tractor came off the assembly line at the Farmall Plant in Illinois. IH was the first tractor manufacturer to accomplish this. Also in 1973, IH officially dropped the "Farmall" name from its tractor. This ended an era that began with the first Farmall "Regular" back in 1924.

The  4568 V-8 4WD was introduced in 1975. In 1976, the entire tractor line got a new paint job and decal pattern. No longer were the side panels all white with chrome and black decals: they were now all red with a black-striped sticker. This was done to clear inventory for the forthcoming Pro Ag Line.

In September 1976, IH released their 86 series Pro Ag Line. The models included the  786, the   886, the  986, the  186 Hydro, the  1086, the  1486 and the  1586. These new tractors had a new cab dubbed the Control Center that came standard with air conditioning, heat, and several radio-CB options. The driver sat well ahead of the rear axle and the fuel tank was mounted behind the cab over the rear axle. This increased balance and ride. Also in 1976, the  686 along with the "86" series four-wheel-drives were introduced, including the 4186, 4386, 4586, and 4786.

In 1977, International Harvester introduced the first Axial-Flow rotary combine. This machine, produced at East Moline, Illinois, was the first generation of over 30 years of Axial-Flow combines.

In 1979, IH introduced two all-new tractors: the 3388 and 3588, known as the 2+2 4WD line. These tractors were the result of taking two 1086 rear ends and hooking them together with a transfer case. A year later, the 3788 was introduced. Although these tractors performed well in the field, they never sold well.

1980s
As the 1980s began, IH faced a stable economy, yet an unknown fate. In September 1981, IH announced at a dealership meeting the new "50 Series" of tractors, which included the  5088, the  5288 and the  5488. IH also released the "30 series", which included the  3088, the  3288, the  3488 Hydro, and the  3688. These new tractors  proved once again that IH was innovative. Designed and styled by IH industrial designer Gregg Montgomery (Montgomery Design International), the new stylish design of the 50 and 30 series  changed the look of tractors from that time forward. IH spent over $29 million to develop this new series, and the result was the last great lineup of tractors from International Harvester.

Many technology-related innovations were used in the new series. A computer monitoring system (Sentry) was developed, and IH became the first manufacturer to add a computer to a farm tractor. Other innovations included a "Z" shift pattern, an 18-speed synchronized transmission, a forward air-flow cooling system which sucked air from above the hood and blew it out the front grille, "Power Priority" three-pump hydraulic system, color-coded hydraulic lines and controls, and a new rear-hitch system. The 50 Series had an unprecedented three-year or 2,500-hour engine and drive-train warranty, which later became an industry standard. Although no new sales records were set, IH sold a respectable number of these tractors during their short production time. IH also released the "60 series 2+2s" and planned on making the "Super 70 series" 2+2s, but only a handful of these exist today. On May 14, 1985, the last IH tractor rolled off the factory line, a 5488 FWA.

In the late 1970s, IH entered a deal with Spain's Enasa to build diesel engines there as Internacional de Motores. After a downturn in the market coupled to problems with Spain's entry into the European Economic Community threatened the profitability of this project, International Harvester withdrew in 1982. In return for being allowed to escape all conditions of the joint venture, IH lost their up-front investment in the engine plant and ended up selling British truck manufacturer Seddon Atkinson (which had belonged to IH since 1974) to Enasa in 1983.

Brand names of the agriculture division

IH over the years used a number of brand names to market their tractor and harvesting products:
International (1902–1985)
Titan (1910–1924)
Mogul (1911–1924)
McCormick–Deering (1922–1947)
McCormick (1947–1958)
Farmall (1924–1973)
Fairway (1924–1938)
Electrall (1954–1956)
Cub (1947-1985)

Other agricultural products
Along with the prominent tractor division, IH also sold several different types of farm-related equipment, such as balers, cultivators, combines (self-propelled and pull behind), combine heads, corn shellers, cotton pickers, manure spreaders, hay rakes, crop dusters, disk harrows, elevators, feed grinders, hammer mills, hay conditioners, milking machines, planters, mills, discs, plows, and  miscellaneous equipment.

Also produced were twine, stationary engines and wagons.

Earthmoving division

IH built up its earthmoving division over a period of time, buying companies and acquiring technology. Its heavy tractor range was an established offering, however IH wanted to offer innovative new construction technology. Significant moves included the purchase of the Frank G Hough company  which produced an iconic machine called a PayLoader, and the purchase of French company Yumbo, which produced hydraulic excavators.

Between 1956 and 1982 IH developed and sold a range of off-road dump trucks, which were known commercially as 'PayHaulers'.

International manufactured and sold an extensive range of heavy equipment. In 1974 IH renamed this division the 'Payline' division.

Payloaders 
The original payloader model was literally a tractor which had forks welded to the front. Frank Hough was the man who invented the concept and Hough's company worked closely with IH until it was purchased in 1952. The terminology came to mean any type of front loader machine, and loaders were manufactured in a number of varieties, included wheeled and track loaders, rear wheel loaders or an articulated steering design.

PayScrapers 

In the early 1950s contractors worldwide began using motor scrapers as a means of shifting dirt. IH had a hole in its product range; it did not offer a motor scraper product to the market. One of IH's suppliers, a company named Heil Earthmovers, manufactured a range of scrapers called 'Heiliners.'

Rather than spend money on R&D and enter the market at a later date, in 1953 IH bought Heil's road machinery division, incorporating a range of motor and towed scrapers.

Attachments: blades, buckets, rippers and compaction equipment 
IH International had a supply agreement for its heavy tractor attachments with a
company called Bucyrus-Erie. Amongst a variety of attachment solutions Bucyrus-Erie made a range of cable and hydraulically operated blades which fitted International-Harvester track type tractors.

IH purchased the blades range from Bucyrus-Erie in the 1950s and absorbed these into its machinery division.

IH also purchased attachments for the tractor range from Isaacson, including logging arches and dozer blades. Carrying on with its expansion IH purchased Isaacson's attachments division in 1952.

Electrall 
The Electrall system was introduced in 1954; it was a short-lived attempt to market electrically operated farm equipment and accessories. The system, co-developed with General Electric, consisted of a 208 V three-phase alternating-current generator connected with electric cables to the device to be powered. The generator could even power a household. A 10 kW Electrall generator was an option on the Farmall 400 tractor, and  a 12.5 kW PTO-driven version was made. The possible applications of Electrall power were many, but few made it to market. IH marketing materials showed a haybaler being Electrall powered. One of the more novel applications of the Electrall was a device to electrocute insects in the field at night (basically like a modern-day bug zapper, but on a larger scale).

Road vehicles

Light duty trucks
IH is often remembered as a maker of relatively successful and innovative "light" lines of vehicles, competing directly against the Big Three. The most common were pickup trucks. IH made light trucks from 1907 to 1975, beginning with the Model A Auto Wagon (sometimes called the "Auto Buggy"). Production commenced in February 1907 at IH's McCormick Works in Chicago, although production was moved to Akron, Ohio, in October that year. It featured a rear seat convertible to a carrier bed. The Auto Wagon was renamed the Motor Truck in 1910, and was a forerunner to the successful modern pickup truck. They were called IHC until 1914, when the 'International' name was first applied. The final light line truck was made on May 5, 1975.

Following the early success with the Auto Buggy, International released their K and KB series trucks in the mid-1940s. They were more simplistic than other trucks released in that era. This was followed by the L Series in 1949, which was replaced by the R Series in 1952, followed by the S line (a name re-used later for IH's larger medium-duty trucks) in 1955. In 1957, to celebrate IH's golden anniversary as a truck manufacturer, this was replaced by the new A line. 'A' stands for anniversary. With light modifications to its appearance, but more serious changes under the shell (and a number of new names), this design continued in production until replaced by the 1100D in late 1969, which looked very similar to the Scout which was already in production.

Corresponding with the truck "letter lines" was the Metro line of step (delivery) vans. Starting in 1938 and manufactured through 1975, the Metro series was produced and updated with each iteration of IH's truck lines. Also, special-use variants were sold, such as the Metro Coach (a bus version with windows and passenger seats) and Metro front-end section and chassis for full commercial customization. Additional variants were based on the medium-duty engine and chassis lines.

IH abandoned sales of passenger vehicles in 1980 to concentrate on commercial trucks and school buses.

The Scout and Light Truck parts business was sold to Scout/Light Line Distributors, Inc. in 1991.

Sport-utility vehicles 
One of the company's light-duty vehicles was the Travelall, which was similar in concept to the Chevrolet Suburban. The Travelette was a crew cab, available in two- or four-wheel drive. A three-door version was available starting in 1957, and a four-door version was available starting in 1961. The 1961 Travelette four-door (crewcab) was the first six-passenger, four-door truck of its time.

The Scout, first introduced in 1961, is a small, two-door SUV, similar to a Jeep.  In 1972, the Scout became the Scout II, and in 1974, Dana 44 axles, power steering, and power disc brakes became standard. After the Light Line pickups and Travelall were discontinued in 1975, the Scout Traveler and Terra became available, both with a longer wheelbase than a standard Scout II.

Motorhomes
In the 1970s, motorhomes were manufactured using IHC engines and bare chassis. Most of the bodies were constructed of fiberglass.

Commercial trucks (Truck and Engine Division) 
International Harvester was an early manufacturer of medium- and heavy-duty trucks. Although based upon truck chassis, IH also became the leading manufacturer of the chassis portion of body-on-chassis conventional (type C) school buses. In 1962, IH offered the International Harvester Loadstar which became the premier medium-duty truck. In 1978, IH offered the International Harvester S-Series, which replaced the Loadstar in 1979.

With the truck and engine divisions remaining following the 1985 sale of the agricultural division, International Harvester Company changed their corporate name to Navistar International in 1986. Today, Navistar International's subsidiary, International Truck and Engine Corporation, manufactures and markets trucks and engines under the International brand name.  From 1983 to 2010, Ford Motor Company offered International V8 diesel engines in heavy-duty pickup trucks, vans, and SUVs (using the Power Stroke name after 1994).

1960s 

In 1961, the DCO-400 "Emeryville" model line was expanded with a conventional; officially named the D-400, the model line shared its cab with the COE and was the first International conventional produced with a tilting hood.

In 1962, International began to phase out the R-line series of trucks (dating to 1953).  In place of a comprehensive model line ranging from half-ton pickup trucks to its largest Class 8 trucks, International introduced two purpose-built model lines for commercial use.  Slotted above its Light Line pickup trucks, the Loadstar was a medium-duty conventional-cab truck.  For 1963, International introduced the heavier-duty Fleetstar, a short-hood conventional slotted between the Loadstar and the heavier-duty R and V-Line conventionals.  While no longer serving as a comprehensive model range, the Loadstar shared its cab with the A-series pickup truck (and its derivatives); as a cowled chassis, the Loadstar was produced for bus use (the IHC Schoolmaster).  Sharing only its name with its conventional-cab namesake, the Loadstar CO was a low-cab COE (with a forward-tilting cab).

In 1965, International introduced the CO-4000, the first heavy-duty COE designed entirely by the company, replacing the DCO-400 "Emeryville" COE (which sourced its cab design from Diamond T).  In a design feature that would be adopted by International COEs into the 1990s, the cab was designed with a large trapezoidal grille.

In 1968, International redesigned the Fleetstar, adopting the cab of the Light Line pickups.  Renamed the Fleetstar-A, the redesign marked the consolidation of the Fleetstar with the previous R-line and V-line trucks.  The largest R-210 and R-230 remained (dropping their R prefix) alongside the newly introduced M-series as the largest International trucks, sharing a common cab (dating back to 1952).  The Transtar name made its first appearance, as the CO-4000 was replaced by the Transtar CO4070/4090; while visually similar to its predecessor, the Transtar CO was designed with an all-new cab (to accommodate larger diesel engines).

For 1969, International introduced the final version of the Emeryville model line, with the DC-400 Transtar 400 replacing the D-400.

1970s 

In 1970, International split the CO Loadstar into its own product line, dubbed the Cargostar.  As part of a model update, the Cargostar received a larger grille and wider cab over its predecessor.  Competing directly against the Ford C-Series, the Cargostar was a medium-duty truck fitted with both gasoline and diesel engines (shared with the Loadstar conventional).

1971 marked the end of the "Emeryville" product lines, as the DC-400 Transtar 400 was replaced by the Transtar 4200/4300.  Developed as a Class 8 highway tractor, the Transtar 4200/4300 introduced an all-new cab that would be used for International heavy-duty trucks through 1999.  Competing against a wide range of manufacturers, the Transtar conventional was offered in both short and long-hood configurations for both regional and long-distance shipping.

In 1972, the Paystar 5000 series was introduced, replacing the 210/230 and M-series trucks (dating to 1952).  Developed for severe-service use (primarily construction and related applications), the Paystar shared its cab with the Transtar, using a heavier-duty chassis, steel fenders, and a flat-panel hood.  The medium-duty Loadstar received an optional tilting hood with a larger grille and straighter-edge fenders (updating its appearance for the first time in 10 years).

In 1974, the Transtar II COE was introduced, following a redesign of the Transtar.  Distinguished by top-mounted windshield wipers, the Transtar II standardized the previous raised-cab option, as the previous 852 cubic-inch Detroit Diesel 12V71 V12 was replaced by some of the largest-displacement engines ever fitted to a road-going vehicle, including the Cummins KTA diesel I6 (1,150 cubic inches) and the Caterpillar 3408 diesel V8 (1,099 cubic inches).  On the other end of the size scale, the Cargostar underwent a second update, with a slightly wider cab and a much larger grille (sharing the black trim band of the Transtar COE grille).

For 1976, International launched its "Eagle" flagship brand, used into the 2010s.

In 1977, the International S-series was introduced, consolidating the Fleetstar and Loadstar into a single model range.  While less comprehensive than the product ranges of the 1930s to the 1950s, the S-series product line included medium-duty, heavy-duty, severe-service, and highway trucks (along with a new generation of the Schoolmaster bus chassis) from the Class 5 to Class 8 size ranges.  At its 1977 launch, the S-series was introduced to replace the Fleetstar, with lighter-duty models phased in to replace the Loadstar during 1979.  Competing against an extensive segment of the truck industry, the S-Series was produced in multiple layouts, hood lengths, and axle configurations; gasoline and diesel engines were offered.

Produced as a cowled chassis (Schoolmaster), straight truck, or semitractor, the S-Series was produced from 1977 to 2004, remaining the longest-produced vehicle line ever produced by International (as either International Harvester or Navistar).

1980s 

In 1981, International introduced the CO9670, replacing the Transtar II.  Sharing only the trapezoidal grille with the previous Transtar II, the CO9670 was designed with a larger cab with improved visibility and improved access (larger windshield, shared doors with the Transtar/Paystar conventional); to increase fuel economy, the Cummins KTA diesel was replaced by a turbocharged Cummins N-series I6.

For 1985, the Transtar conventional was reintroduced, becoming the International 9000 series; while the short-hood Transtar was discontinued (overlapped by the S2200 and S2300 Class 8 tractors), the long-hood 4300 was renamed the International 9370.  Sharing its cab with the Transtar, the 9370 was restyled with a larger grille and vertically stacked quad headlamps.

After seeing almost no change since 1974, International ended production of the Cargostar (the final Loadstar-based truck).  As the company did not develop a tilt-cab truck derived from the S-series (or a distinct vehicle), International introduced the 400/500/700/900 low-cab COE, produced by Nissan Diesel (UD).  The first imported vehicle marketed by the company, the 400-900 was marketed through 1991.

Overseas subsidiaries

Australia

Australian Army designs
International Harvester Australia, a subsidiary of the US manufacturer, had a long relationship with the Australian Army with the US-designed AS series trucks in the early 1950s.  The AS164 4x2 used as a tractor unit and the 4x2 AS161 used as a trayback troop transport

The association between International Harvester Australia and the Australian Army developed and in conjunction with the Army Design Establishment of the Australian Commonwealth Department of Supply, designed and constructed a range of trucks for the Australian Army.  With the body loosely based upon the design of cab 13 of the Canadian Military Pattern truck, the first prototype built in 1959 was the International Truck Cargo  Ton General Service, Australian No.1 Mk1. which was followed by the Mk2 prototype. A variant with a midmounted, 20,000-lb winch, resulted in the first production model, the Mk3 entering service in 1963 – just in time for Australia's entry into the Vietnam War.

A five-ton 6×6 version was to follow with three major variants the Truck Cargo 5 Ton with winch F1 which replaced the Mk3 in Vietnam service.

The F2 a tipper version that replaced the International Harvester AB160 "teaspoon Tipper" in both Vietnam and Borneo theatres of operations.

The F5 wrecker with a lack of 4×4  ton trucks available because of the Vietnam War, the Mk3 was supplemented with further 4×4 production with the updated Mk4 version which shared the cab with the 6×6 variants Production of The Australian No.1. range of trucks were produced until 1973.  The Mk3, Mk4, F1, F2 and F5 saw service until the late 1980s.

ACCO
The Australian designed and built International Australian A-line Cab Over (AACO) was first produced in the late 1960s and later in 1972 the Australian C-line Cab Over (ACCO) . The ACCO is a cab over engine type truck and has been offered in 4x2, 4x4, 6x2, 6x4, 8x4, and 10x4 configurations. Engines used have been Cummins, Caterpillar, Detroit Diesel, Perkins, Neuss or GMC with Road-Ranger or Allison transmissions and Rockwell differentials. The ACCO range were built to order, serving private operators, fire departments, military services, and municipal departments across Australia and New Zealand. The ACCO became the most popular product of International Harvester in Australia. The ACCO was discontinued in November 2019 and replaced by a locally built European designed ACCO, under the ownership of Iveco.

Brazilian subsidiary
International Harvester Máquinas S.A. was established with Brazilian government support as part of a project to develop a vehicle industry there. Their first product was the International S-184 heavy truck. In 1966 Chrysler purchased International's Brazilian plant.

Home products

Home appliances

Although best known for farm equipment, IH produced home appliances for farmers and nonfarmers alike. This included refrigeration equipment such as refrigerators, air conditioners, and freezers.  IH had a refrigeration division of its own, as did other vehicle manufacturers of the time: Ford had Philco, Chrysler had Airtemp, General Motors had Frigidaire, Nash-Kelvinator Corporation (and then American Motors) had Kelvinator, Studebaker had the Franklin Appliance Company, and Crosley had Crosley.

The IH appliance division had originally been developed to manufacture commercial-grade items to farmers, most of whom had just received electricity by way of the many electrification projects in the U.S. before and after World War II. Among the offerings were milk coolers and walk-in freezers for produce and meat. Later on, IH courted the farmer's wife with kitchen refrigerators available in the latest designer styles. The IH spokeswoman for these products was Irma Harding, a factory trademark. These products were introduced in 1947 and sold for less than 10 years. The refrigeration division was sold to Whirlpool Corporation in 1955. Since the duration of production was short, IH appliances are rare today.

On the American sitcom Friends, the refrigerator in Monica's apartment is a circa 1950 International Harvester. Several close-ups can be seen in Season 8, Episode 17, "TOW The Tea Leaves."

Lawn and garden

IH branched out into the home lawn and garden business in 1961 with its line of Cub Cadet equipment, which included riding and walk-behind lawn mowers and snow blowers. Also produced were compost shredders, rotary tillers, Cadet garden tractors, and power washers.

The Cub Cadet line was sold to MTD Products in 1981.

Other products

Defense
IH manufactured light, medium, and heavy vehicles for military use. Examples include a Metro van sold to the Czechoslovakian Army in 1938, M5 Tractors and 2.5-ton M-5H-6 trucks for the US Navy and Marines in 1942, and around 3,500 2.5 ton M-5-6-318 cargo trucks provided mostly to the Soviet Union and China.

Weapons
In early 1951, the United States Army through the Springfield Armory contracted International Harvester to produce M1 rifles, and from 1953 to 1956 IH produced 337,623 rifles in total, according to the Army Ordnance Department.

HT-341
In 1959, International Harvester created a jet turbine-powered tractor called the International HT-341. It was donated to the Smithsonian Institution in 1967.

See also

Farmall tractor
Farmall Cub
High wheeler
International Harvester Scout
"International Harvester" song
List of International Harvester/Navistar engines
List of International Harvester vehicles
Lee Klancher

References

Further reading
 

 Pripps, Robert N.; Morland, Andrew (photographer) (1993) Farmall Tractors: History of International McCormick-Deering Farmall Tractors (Farm Tractor Color History Series, Osceola, WI, USA: MBI), ISBN 978-0-87938-763-1

 Winder, Gordon M. (2016) The American Reaper: Harvesting Networks and Technology, 1830-1910 (Routledge, ISBN 9781317045151)

External links 

International Harvester Forum
International Harvester Digest
The Binder Planet: all IH light trucks technical resource website
McCormick – International Harvester Collection
International Harvester tractors
Old International Harvester Truck Special Interest Group
Trucks
1970s International 4030 Yard Crane Tractor

1902 establishments in Illinois
1985 disestablishments in Illinois
Agricultural machinery manufacturers of the United States
Defunct bus manufacturers of the United States
Defunct companies based in Illinois
Defunct motor vehicle manufacturers of the United States
Defunct truck manufacturers of the United States
Emergency services equipment makers
Former components of the Dow Jones Industrial Average
Fulton County, Illinois
Home appliance manufacturers of the United States
Iveco trucks
Manufacturing companies based in Chicago
Vehicle manufacturing companies established in 1902
Vehicle manufacturing companies disestablished in 1985
Navistar International
Pickup trucks
Tractor manufacturers of the United States
Truck manufacturers of the United States
Brass Era vehicles
Highwheeler
1900s cars
1910s cars